Abdulmanap Magomedovich Nurmagomedov (10 December 1962 – 3 July 2020) was a Russian military veteran, former judoka and combat sports coach. 
In September 2019, he was named by the Russian Book of Records as the most successful combat sambo coach in the country. He was the father and coach of retired UFC lightweight champion Khabib Nurmagomedov, and coach of current UFC Lightweight Champion Islam Makhachev.

Biography

An ethnic Avar, Nurmagomedov was born in 1962 in the village of Sildi, Tsumadinsky District. In 1987 he graduated from the Poltava University of Economics and Trade with a degree in accounting and economics. He had two sons, Magomed and Khabib, and one daughter, Amina. He started his sporting career with freestyle wrestling, which he, like many Dagestani children, had practiced from a young age. While serving in the Soviet Army, he began to practice judo and sambo.

His first big success as a coach came when his brother, Nurmagomed Nurmagomedov, won at the World Sambo Championship for Ukraine's national team in 1992. He trained a total of 18 world champions through his coaching career.

At the end of April 2020, during the COVID-19 pandemic in Russia, Nurmagomedov was hospitalized in the 2nd city hospital of Makhachkala with bilateral pneumonia caused by COVID-19. Having been taken to Moscow in early May on a private jet, his condition rapidly worsened, and he died there on 3 July 2020, from COVID complications. He was 57 years old. On 4 July, he was buried in his native village. Following his death, his son Khabib announced his retirement from mixed martial arts following his victory over Justin Gaethje at UFC 254, a fight which he dedicated to the memory of his father.

Notable students

Mixed martial arts
 Khabib Nurmagomedov – Former UFC Lightweight Champion. Two-time WCSF Sambo World Champion.
 Islam Makhachev – Current UFC Lightweight Champion. 2016 FIAS Combat Sambo World Champion.
 Usman Nurmagomedov – Current Bellator Lightweight Champion
 Movlid Khaybulaev – 2021 (Current) PFL Featherweight World Champion.
 Sultan Aliev – Two-time FIAS Combat Sambo World Champion. Formerly competed in UFC and Bellator from 2011 to 2019.
 Ikram Aliskerov – Brave Combat Federation Middleweight. 2016 FIAS Combat Sambo World Champion.
 Magomedrasul Khasbulaev – Current ACA Featherweight Champion. 2010 WCSF Sambo World Champion.
 Shamil Zavurov – Former M-1 Global Welterweight World Champion. Three-time WCSF Sambo World Champion. 
 Rustam Khabilov – Bellator Welterweight. 2007 WCSF Sambo World Champion.
 Tagir Ulanbekov – UFC Flyweight
 Abubakar Nurmagomedov – UFC Welterweight
 Zubaira Tukhugov – UFC Featherweight
 Umar Nurmagomedov – UFC Bantamweight. 2015 WCSF Sambo World Champion.
 Islam Mamedov – Bellator Lightweight 
 Gadzhi Rabadanbov – Bellator Featherweight
 Saygid Izagakhmaev – ONE Championship Welterweight

Wrestling
 Abasgadzhi Magomedov – Freestyle wrestling World Champion.
 Magomedkhabib Kadimagomedov – 2020 Olympic Silver Medalist.

References

1962 births
2020 deaths
Honoured Coaches of Russia
Nurmagomedov family
Russian sambo practitioners
Russian male martial artists
Russian male judoka
Sportspeople from Dagestan
Deaths from the COVID-19 pandemic in Russia
Russian Muslims
Avar people
Russian people of Dagestani descent
Soviet Army personnel